Demons Protected by Angels is the fourth studio album by Canadian rapper Nav. It was released through XO and Republic Records on September 9, 2022. The album contains guest appearances from Lil Uzi Vert, Lil Baby, Travis Scott, Don Toliver, Future, Gunna, Lil Durk, RealestK, Bryson Tiller, and Babyface Ray. The bonus version was released on September 14, 2022. It includes an additional guest appearance from Internet Money for the previously-released 2020 single, "Lemonade", their collaboration featuring Gunna, Don Toliver, and Nav. Production on the single was handled by Nav himself, Tay Keith, Boi-1da, Money Musik, Pro Logic, Grayson, Mike Dean, and Wheezy, among others. The album was nominated for Album of the Year and Rap Album/EP of the Year, and "Wrong Decisions" for Rap Single of the Year, at the Juno Awards of 2023.

Background and promotion
On June 27, 2022, Nav took to Twitter to announce the title of the album and shared a screenshot of the tweet on social media. On July 29, 2022, he released the lead single, "Never Sleep", a collaboration with American rapper Lil Baby, which features fellow American rapper and singer Travis Scott. The same day the song was released, he was interviewed by Complex, in which he spoke about the album and how it was named:The album title was inspired by a sweater that my friend had made. And I've begged him to get the sweater. I was like, "Yo, I wanna wear your shit and support my friend's stuff." So he brought it out and it had that on the back of the sweater. And it was very meaningful to me, because he came up with that himself when his mom passed away about a year ago. So I was like, "Wow, that's even better." Like, it actually has a good meeting . So that's why we came up with it. [...] Someone close to me had pointed my eyes toward the sweater. They're like, "Oh, that's fire, can you make an album called that?" But the whole quote on this sweater was "fighting demons protected by angels." We thought it was too long. Then one of my producers had mentioned, "Maybe we should take the 'fighting' out." We thought about it, and called our friends to ask them their opinion. We all said it's kind of dope. Then one day we were playing dominoes in the studio, and I just randomly asked him, 'How'd you come up with that?' He found that on Google, and then he told me where it's from. It was even more meaningful. On August 23, 2022, Nav released the second single of the album, "Wrong Decisions". Exactly one week later, he revealed the release date, along with a trailer video that revealed the featured artists, which did not include American rapper Gunna at the time. On September 5, 2022, Nav shared the cover art for the album. He revealed the tracklist in collaboration with Spotify hip hop playlist RapCaviar the following day. On September 8, 2022, the day before the album was released, Nav was interviewed by Canadian-American YouTube channel Nelk's Full Send Podcast, in which he revealed that he recorded a song with fellow Canadian rapper and singer Drake, but he decided to not include it on the album because he felt that they "could've done a better song and the timeframe was just not good" and along with the latter is "such a big artist" that he did not want the song to "take away from anything else on the album". On September 13, 2022, "One Time", a collaboration with American rapper and singer Don Toliver, which features fellow American rapper Future, was released as the third and final single of the album.

Critical reception
 
Writing for Pitchfork, Matthew Ritchie felt that Nav "attempts to shift focus away from the beats and features, finally treating the songs like they're his own" and "Nav lets extended moments of true self-awareness break through his manicured shell, momentarily deviating from the soulless bars that often fill his albums", but conversely added that "ceding too much room to guests undermines Nav's individuality and causes the star-powered tracks to veer toward the generic".

Accolades

Commercial performance
Demons Protected by Angels debuted at number two on the US Billboard 200 chart, earning 67,000 album-equivalent units, of which 26,000 were in pure album sales in its first week.  It serves as Nav's fifth consecutive top-ten album in the country. The album also accumulated a total of 60.13 million on-demand streams of the album's songs during the tracking week.

Track listing

Notes
 signifies a co-producer

Charts

Weekly charts

Year-end charts

References

2022 albums
Nav (rapper) albums
Republic Records albums
Albums produced by Nav (rapper)
Albums produced by Tay Keith
Albums produced by Mike Dean (record producer)
Albums produced by Wheezy